The following is a list of events, births, and deaths in 1935 in Switzerland.

Incumbents
Federal Council:
Giuseppe Motta 
Edmund Schulthess then Hermann Obrecht
Philipp Etter
Johannes Baumann
Marcel Pilet-Golaz 
Albert Meyer
Rudolf Minger (President)

Tournaments
1934-35 Nationalliga
1935 European Figure Skating Championships
FIS Alpine World Ski Championships 1935
1935 Swiss Grand Prix
1935 World Ice Hockey Championships
EuroBasket 1935 took place in Geneva in May
1935–36 Nationalliga

Establishments
Swiss Society of New Zealand

Events
The Berne Trial is in progress, and ending in this year (from 1933)
The Eternal Mask, an Austrian-Swiss drama, is released

Births
February 5-Michel Steininger, a fencer
March 5-Felix Walker, a politician
March 24-Peter Bichsel, a writer and journalist
April 12-Heinz Schneiter, a footballer (association football)
August 16-Bruno Spoerri, a musician
September 18-Dimitri, a clown
September 19-Hansjörg Wyss, businessman and philanthropist
November 11-Raymund Schwager, a Roman Catholic priest and theologian (d.  February 27 2004)
Martina Deuchler, an academic
Peter Baumann, a psychiatrist (d. 2011)

Deaths
March 26-Eugene Zimmerman, a Swiss-American cartoonist (b. May 26, 1862)
September 19-Jules Cambon, a French diplomat who died in Switzerland (b. April 5, 1845)
Benita von Falkenhayn, a German baroness who served as a spy for the Second Polish Republic (b. August 14, 1900)
François De Loys, an oil geologist who allegedly discovered a hitherto-unknown primate (b. 1892)

References

 
1935 in Swiss sport
1935 in Europe
Years of the 20th century in Switzerland